Gordon Harold Jago  (born 22 October 1932) is an English former football player and manager, and the former director of the Dr. Pepper Dallas Cup international youth tournament.

Playing career
Born in Poplar, London, Jago began his professional career as a center back in the Football League at Charlton Athletic, with whom he joined in the 1954–55 season from non-league team Dulwich Hamlet. Prior to Charlton, he played in six full internationals as a member of the England U20 squad. He made a total of 147 appearances for Charlton, scoring one goal, at The Valley. His final season with the Addicks was 1961–62 before he moved back to non-league football, managing Eastbourne United. He started his coaching career with a spell at Fulham.

Managerial and coaching career
In 1967 he was appointed coach of the National Professional Soccer League, and future NASL side, Baltimore Bays. He later served in a dual capacity as the team's general manager as well. 
During this time Jago was also named coach of the United States national team but ended this role after suffering two defeats in his only games in charge.

Success in England
In 1970 Jago joined Queens Park Rangers as a coach and became manager in January 1971. It was under his guidance that the basis of the QPR team which in 1975–76 would come within a point of the League title was assembled. He signed pivotal players such as Stan Bowles, Don Givens, Dave Thomas and Frank McLintock and led the club to promotion to the First Division in 1972–73. Jago left the club in October 1974 and was later appointed manager of Millwall where he remained until 1977. In 1976 Jago took Millwall from the Third to the Second Division.

Tampa Bay Rowdies
Jago returned to North America to coach the NASL side, Tampa Bay Rowdies between 1978 and 1982. He saw great success especially early on in Tampa, losing in the outdoor final in both 1978 and 1979 and winning an indoor championship in his second year. Jago would return the Rowdies to the indoor final in the 1981-82 season, but came up short on his second try. He took the Rowdies to the outdoor post-season in four of his five years in Tampa, before resigning in the latter part of a disappointing 1982 outdoor campaign.

Dallas Sidekicks
After a very brief stint as the general manager at QPR in 1984, Jago later had two separate stints as coach of indoor soccer side Dallas Sidekicks between 1984 and 1997. In between he served as the Sidekicks' team president. In 1996 he also became a ten percent stakeholder in the club. In 1998 Jago stepped down as coach for good. He became President of the World Indoor Soccer League until the merger with the MISL for the 2002–03 season. From 2013 to 2016 Jago served as the colour commentator to Norm Hitzes for the Dallas Sidekicks' televised MASL home games.

Dr. Pepper Dallas Cup
Jago served as Executive Director of the Dr Pepper Dallas Cup before he stepped down in 2013. Afterward he continued to be an Ambassador and Special Consultant for the tournament. During his tenure the Dallas Cup rose to become one of the preeminent youth soccer tournaments in the world.

Recognition
In 2005 he was made a charter member of the FC Dallas Walk of Fame. In recognition of his lifetime of achievements in advancing the sport, he was made a Member of the Order of the British Empire (MBE) by Queen Elizabeth II in 2006. In December 2010 at the ESPN Wide World of Sports Disney Showcase, Gordon Jago was presented the "Lifelong Achievement Award" at Disney World in Orlando.

In March 2013, Jago was one of six men named to the 2013 class of the Indoor Soccer Hall of Fame. The other inductees, all players, are Preki, Kai Haaskivi, Zoltán Tóth, Brian Quinn, and Mike Stankovic.

A member of the Sidekicks Hall of Fame, he was also awarded a Lifetime Achievement Award by the Dr. Pepper Dallas Cup in recognition of his invaluable, selfless, and far reaching contribution to the beautiful game in March 2016.

Personal life
Jago married his wife June Isabella Jago, a former London police officer, in March 1960. The couple raised one daughter, Kim, and remained together for 54 years until June died on 8 December 2014. In March 2017 his autobiography, A Soccer Pioneer: The Autobiography of Gordon Jago, was published by Saint Johann Press.

Coaching honours

Queens Park Rangers
Second Division promotion to First Div: 1972–73

Millwall
Third Division promotion to Second Div.: 1975–76

Tampa Bay Rowdies
Champion (1)
NASL indoor: 1979–80
Runner-up (4)
Soccer Bowl: 1978, 1979
NASL indoor: 1979, 1981–82
Conference champion (3)
American Conference: 1978, 1979
Atlantic Conference indoor: 1981–82
Division champion (3)
Eastern Division (of Atlantic Conf.): 1978, 1979, 1980

Dallas Sidekicks
Champion (2)
MISL: 1986–87
CISL: 1993
Runner-up (2)
MSL: 1991–92
CISL: 1994
Division champion (2)
MISL Eastern Division: 1986–87
CISL Eastern Division: 1994

Individual Honors
Coach of the Year (3)
MISL: 1986–87, 1991–92, 1993
FC Dallas Walk of Fame: 2005
Member of the Order of the British Empire: 2006
Indoor Soccer Hall of Fame: 2013
Dr. Pepper Dallas Cup Lifetime Achievement Award: 2016

References

External links

1932 births
Living people
Footballers from Poplar, London
English footballers
Dulwich Hamlet F.C. players
Charlton Athletic F.C. players
English football managers
Queens Park Rangers F.C. managers
Millwall F.C. managers
United States men's national soccer team managers
Major Indoor Soccer League (1978–1992) coaches
North American Soccer League (1968–1984) coaches
North American Soccer League (1968–1984) executives
Members of the Order of the British Empire
Expatriate soccer managers in the United States
Tampa Bay Rowdies coaches
Association football executives
Association football central defenders
English autobiographers